Montagna in Valtellina is a comune (municipality) in the Province of Sondrio in the Italian region Lombardy, located about  northeast of Milan and about  northeast of Sondrio.

Montagna in Valtellina borders the following municipalities: Caspoggio, Chiuro, Faedo Valtellino, Lanzada, Piateda, Poggiridenti, Ponte in Valtellina, Sondrio, Spriana, Torre di Santa Maria, Tresivio.

References

External links

 Official website

Cities and towns in Lombardy